Honneur, patrie, valeur, discipline (Honour, fatherland, valour, discipline) is the motto of the French Navy. It is found inscribed on all ships and buildings, sometimes with each word on its separate plaque at a corner of the superstructure.

Origin 
The motto uses words found in traditional mottos of French institutions: "Honneur - Patrie", and "Valeur - Discipline"
 "Honneur - Patrie" is the motto of the Légion d'honneur; it has been inscribed on military flags under the First French Empire, and also became the motto of the French Navy from 1830; 
 "Valeur - Discipline"  was inscribed on military flags under the late First Empire; fallen in disuse under the Bourbon Restauration, is reappeared on the flags of the French Second Republic and on the reverse of the Médaille militaire.

Probably under the Second French Empire, these two mottos fused and became features of French naval ships.

See also 
 Honneur et fidélité

Sources and references 
 L'origine de la devise : "Honneur, Patrie, Valeur Discipline", Le fauteuil de Colbert.

French Navy
Mottos
French words and phrases